James B. McClintock (born Ann Arbor, MI) is an American professor of biology at the University of Alabama at Birmingham and studies various aspects of marine biology in Antarctica.  He is an authority on the effects of climate change in Antarctica which is detailed in his book  Lost Antarctica – Adventures in a Disappearing Land,.

McClintock received his bachelor's degree from the University of California at Santa Cruz in 1978 and his PhD from the University of South Florida in 1984.  In 1987, after completing a National Science Foundation Postdoctoral Fellowship at the University of California at Santa Cruz, he joined the faculty of the Department of Biology at the University of Alabama at Birmingham and is the Endowed University Professor of Polar and Marine Biology.

Academic Background

McClintock grew up along the Pacific Ocean in Santa Barbara, CA.  His initial research focused on echinoderm (primarily sea star and sea urchin) nutrition, and reproduction in both the Pacific and Atlantic oceans.  In 1982 he made his first scientific visit into the Indian Ocean as a participant in the French Antarctic Research Program, working at a research base on the sub-Antarctic island of Kerguelen.  The following two years, as a National Science Foundation Postdoctoral Fellow, McClintock continued his echinoderm studies in the waters of Antarctica's Southern Ocean at the United States research station McMurdo Station.

Since 1989 McClintock has led or co-directed fourteen scientific expeditions with the United States Antarctic Program (USAP) in which he and his research collaborators have become authorities on Antarctic marine chemical ecology. This work, funded by NSF, has been conducted at the United States research facilities McMurdo Station (Ross Sea) and Palmer Station (Antarctic Peninsula). McClintock has published over 200 scientific publications, and co-edited and co-authored several books on marine invertebrates.  In 1998, the U.S. Geographic Board named McClintock Point on the north side of New Harbor, McMurdo Sound, Antarctica, in recognition of his contributions to Antarctic marine biology. In 1999 he wad a elected Fellow in the American Association for the Advancement of Science.

Current Work

His current work, also funded by the NSF, focuses of the impacts of climate change along the western Antarctic Peninsula (WAP). This region of the planet is experiencing unprecedented warming. Moreover, Antarctic seas are uniquely subject to the impacts of ocean acidification, the result of oceans absorbing anthropogenic atmospheric carbon dioxide (CO2). Research projects are underway to examine how the combination of rising seawater temperatures and increased levels of ocean acidification may impact Antarctic marine plants and animals that have calcified body parts.  A separate NSF-funded research program co-directed by McClintock involves an investigation of large populations of king crabs currently invading Antarctic shelf waters  as sea temperatures rise and their prospective impacts on seafloor communities.

McClintock participates in educational outreach activities related to his work as an Antarctic marine ecologist.  He is an appointed member of the Advisory Board of the E.O. Wilson Biodiversity Foundation.

In addition to participating in research expeditions, McClintock leads an annual educational tourist ship based Climate Change Challenge cruise to the Antarctica Peninsula.  He also co-leads study programs to the Galapagos, Bahamas and Costa Rica as part of his teaching activities at UAB. He is the author of A Naturalist Goes Fishing, published by St. Martin's Press (2015).

References

External links
 UAB-Biology website
Lecture: From Penguins to Plankton: The Dramatic Effects of Climate Change on the Antarctic Peninsula (Starts at 17 mins in)
 UAB website with blogs and photos by McClintock

American marine biologists
21st-century American biologists
American science writers
Writers from Ann Arbor, Michigan
University of South Florida alumni
University of Alabama at Birmingham faculty
University of California, Santa Cruz alumni
Fellows of the American Association for the Advancement of Science
Living people
Year of birth missing (living people)